Thomas Robbins Morris (born July 28, 1944) is an American educator who served as Secretary of Education in the cabinet of Virginia Governor Tim Kaine from 2006 to 2010. Prior to his appointment, he served fourteen years as the President of Emory & Henry College in Emory, Virginia. He graduated from the Virginia Military Institute in 1966 with a degree in history and received a Master of Arts and Ph.D. in government from the University of Virginia.

References

Living people
1944 births
State cabinet secretaries of Virginia
Virginia Military Institute alumni
University of Virginia alumni
People from Galax, Virginia
Emory and Henry College faculty